Albert (Jean) Belin (born early 17th century Besançon, died 29 April 1677) was a Bishop of Belley and French writer.

Books written
Pierre philosophale (Paris, 1653)
Talismans justifiés (Paris, 1653)
Poudre de sympathie mystérieuse (Paris, 1653)
Poudre de projection demontrée (Paris, 1653)
Le voyage inconnu (Paris, 1653)
Principes de ves convainquantes des vérités du Christianisme (Paris, 1666)
Preuves convainquantes des verites du Christianisme (Paris, 1666)
Emblèmes eucharistiques, ou octave du très S. Sacrement (1647, 1660)
Les solides pensées de l'ame, pour la porter à son devoir (Paris, 1668)

He probably also published, as Alphonsus Belin, La vérité de la religion catholique et las fausseté de la religion prétendue réformée (Nevers, 1683).

References

17th-century births
1677 deaths
Bishops of Belley
Year of birth unknown